Assemblies (Jehova Shammah) is a Christian denomination of India. It has more than 2,000 branches. It is present in Andhra Pradesh.  Jehova Shammah was founded by Bhakta Singh in 1942.

References 

Christian denominations in India
Christian organizations established in 1942
1942 establishments in India